Approximate max-flow min-cut theorems are mathematical propositions in network flow theory. They deal with the relationship between maximum flow rate ("max-flow") and minimum cut ("min-cut") in a multi-commodity flow problem. The theorems have enabled the development of approximation algorithms for use in graph partition and related problems.

Multicommodity flow problem
A "commodity" in a network flow problem is a pair of source and sink nodes. In a multi-commodity flow problem, there are  commodities, each with its own source , sink , and demand . (In the case of undirected edges, the sum of the flows in both directions cannot exceed the capacity of the edge).
Specially, a 1-commodity (or single commodity) flow problem is also known as a maximum flow problem. According to the Ford–Fulkerson algorithm, the max-flow and min-cut are always equal in a 1-commodity flow problem.

Max-flow and min-cut
min-cut is the minimum of all cuts of the ratio  of the capacity of the cut to the demand of the cut.
Max-flow is always upper bounded by the min-cut for a multicommodity flow problem.

Uniform multicommodity flow problem
In a uniform multicommodity flow problem, there is a commodity for every pair of nodes and the demand for every commodity is the same. (Without loss of generality, the demand for every commodity is set to one.) The underlying network and capacities are arbitrary.

Product multicommodity flow problem
In a product multicommodity flow problem, there is a nonnegative weight for each node  in graph . The uniform multicommodity flow problem is a special case of the product multicommodity flow problem for which the weight is set to 1 for all nodes .

Duality of linear programming

In general, the dual of a multicommodity flow problem for a graph  is the problem of apportioning a fixed amount of weight (where weights can be considered as distances) to the edges of  such that to maximize the cumulative distance between the source and sink pairs.

History
The research on the relationship between the max-flow and min-cut of multicommodity flow problem has obtained great interest since Ford and Fulkerson's result for 1-commodity flow problems. Hu
showed that the max-flow and min-cut are always equal for two commodities. Okamura and Seymour illustrated a 4-commodity flow problem with max-flow equals to 3/4 and min-cut equals 1. Shahrokhi and Matula also proved that the max-flow and min-cut are equal provided the dual of the flow problem satisfies a certain cut condition in a uniform multicommodity flow problem. Many other researchers also showed concrete research results in similar problems

This is not a good result especially in case of large numbers of commodities.

Approximate max-flow min-cut theorems

Theorems of uniform multicommodity flow problems
There are two theorems first introduced by Tom Leighton and Satish Rao in 1988
and then extended in 1999. Theorem 2 gives a tighter bound compared to Theorem 1.

Theorem 1.

Theorem 2.

To prove Theorem 2, both the max-flow and the min-cut should be discussed. 
For the max-flow, the techniques from duality theory of linear programming have to be employed. According to the duality theory of linear programming, an optimal distance function results in a total weight that is equal to the max-flow of the uniform multicommodity flow problem. 
For the min-cut, a 3-stage process has to be followed:

Stage 1: Consider the dual of uniform commodity flow problem and use the optimal solution to define a graph with distance labels on the edges.

Stage 2: Starting from a source or a sink, grow a region in the graph until find a cut of small enough capacity separating the root from its mate.

Stage 3: Remove the region and repeat the process of stage 2 until all nodes get processed.

Generalized to product multicommodity flow problem

Theorem 3.

The proof methodology is similar to that for Theorem 2; the major difference is to take node weights into consideration.

Extended to directed multicommodity flow problem

In a directed multicommodity flow problem, each edge has a direction, and the flow is restricted to move in the specified direction. In a directed uniform multicommodity flow problem, the demand is set to 1 for every directed edge.

Theorem 4.

The major difference in the proof methodology compared to Theorem 2 is that, now the edge directions need to be considered when defining distance labels in stage 1 and for growing the regions in stage 2, more details can be found in.

Similarly, for product multicommodity flow problem, we have the following extended theorem:

Theorem 5.

Applications to approximation algorithms
The above theorems are very useful to design approximation algorithms for NP-hard problems, such as the graph partition problem and its variations. Here below we briefly introduce a few examples, and the in-depth elaborations can be found in Leighton and Rao (1999).

Sparsest cuts
A sparsest cut of a graph  is a partition for which the ratio of the number of edges connecting the two partitioned components over the product of the numbers of nodes of both components is minimized. This is a NP-hard problem, and it can be approximated to within  factor using Theorem 2. Also, a sparsest cut problem with weighted edges, weighted nodes or directed edges can be approximated within an  factor where  is the number of nodes with nonzero weight according to Theorem 3, 4 and 5.

Balanced cuts and separators
In some applications, we want to find a small cut in a graph  that partitions the graph into nearly equal-size pieces. This is also an NP-hard problem. Then we repeat the process then finally obtain the result that total weight of the edges in the cut is at most .

VLSI layout problems
It is helpful to find a layout of minimum size when designing a VLSI circuit. Such a problem can often be modeled as a graph embedding problem. The objective is to find an embedding for which the layout area is minimized. Finding the minimum layout area is also NP-hard. An approximation algorithm has been introduced and the result is  times optimal.

Forwarding index problem
The objective is to find an embedding that minimizes the forwarding index. Using embedding approaches it is possible to bound the node and edge-forwarding indices to within an -factor for every graph .

Planar edge deletion
Tragoudas
uses the approximation algorithm for balanced separators to find a set of 

edges whose removal from a bounded-degree graph  results in a planar graph, where  is the minimum number of edges that need to be removed from  before it becomes planar.

References

Network flow problem
Mathematical theorems